German submarine U-178 was a Type IXD2 U-boat of Nazi Germany's Kriegsmarine built for service during World War II.

Ordered on 28 May 1940, the U-boat was laid down on 24 December 1940 at the AG Weser yard in Bremen as yard number 1018. She was launched on 25 October 1941 and commissioned on 14 February 1942, under the command of Fregattenkapitän Hans Ibekken.

Design
German Type IXD2 submarines were considerably larger than the original Type IXs. U-178 had a displacement of  when at the surface and  while submerged. She had two shafts and two  propellers.

U-178 was fitted with six  torpedo tubes (four fitted at the bow and two at the stern), 24 torpedoes, one  SK C/32 naval gun, 150 rounds, and a  SK C/30 with 2575 rounds as well as two  C/30 anti-aircraft guns with 8100 rounds. The boat had a complement of fifty-five.

First patrol
U-178 sailed from Kiel on 8 September 1942 into the Atlantic, passing north of Scotland and then turned south. She made her first kill on 10 October, putting three torpedoes into the unescorted passenger ship Duchess of Atholl, a Canadian Pacific Steamship Co. liner chartered as a troop transport, about  ENE of Ascension Island in the South Atlantic. The vessel sank slowly and only five crew members were lost. The master, 267 crew members, 25 gunners and all 534 passengers were later rescued by a British vessel.

U-178 then sailed around the Cape of Good Hope into the Indian Ocean south and east of South Africa, sinking the British troopship Mendoza on 1 November, killing the master, 19 crew members, three gunners and three passengers, while 127 of the crew, three gunners and 250 passengers were later picked up by a South African patrol ship and an American merchantman.

U-178 struck twice on 4 November, sinking both the British merchantman Trekieve and the Norwegian cargo ship Hai Hing, off Mozambique.
 
The British merchant ship Louise Moller was sunk about  ExS of Durban on 13 November; two days later the U-boat attacked the British merchant ship Adviser. Seeing the crew abandon the apparently sinking ship, U-178 left the area after hearing depth charges being dropped in the distance. However, Adviser was taken in tow to Durban, where she was repaired and returned to service.

U-178s last victory was on 27 November, sinking the American Liberty ship SS Jeremiah Wadsworth around  S of Cape Agulhas.

U-178 then shaped her course north through the Atlantic, arriving at Bordeaux in France on 10 January 1943 after 125 days at sea.

Second patrol
Under a new commander, Korvettenkapitän Wilhelm Dommes, U-178 sailed from Bordeaux on 28 March 1943, and repeated the success of her previous patrol, this time in the waters of the Mozambique Channel.

Her first victory came on 1 June in a hit-and-run attack on Convoy CD-20. U-178 fired two torpedoes, one of which struck the Dutch cargo ship Salabangka, which later sank.

On 4 July she attacked the Norwegian steamer Breiviken, a straggler from Convoy DN-50. The ship sank within three minutes; U-178 spent some time picking up the crew from the sea and putting them onto rafts. The survivors of Breiviken later found two drifting lifeboats from their own ship, and on 7 July reached the coast. U-178 sailed off in pursuit of another victim, sinking the Greek merchant ship Michael Livanos later that day. On 11 July her sister ship Mary Livanos was also sunk by U-178.

In the early hours of 14 July, the American Liberty ship Robert Bacon was torpedoed about 35 miles off the Mozambique Light. The crew of 44 and 27 Armed Guards (the ship was armed with two 3-inch and eight 20 mm guns), abandoned ship before U-178 finished her off with two more torpedoes. The U-boat surfaced and questioned the survivors in one of the boats, giving them directions to land and wishing them good luck before leaving.

U-178 made her last kill of the patrol on 17 July, sinking the British cargo ship City of Canton northeast of Beira after a pursuit lasting eighteen hours. She then shaped a course across the Indian Ocean to Penang, arriving there on 27 August after 153 days at sea.

Third patrol
K.Kapt. Dommes remained at Penang, commanding the U-Boat base there, located in the former British seaplane headquarters. U-178 sailed from Penang on 25 November 1943 with Kapitänleutnant Wilhelm Spahr in command. She made only one kill, sinking the American Liberty ship SS José Navarro  SW of Cochin, India (now known as Kochi). She then sailed around Africa, back through the Atlantic, arriving in Bordeaux on 25 May 1944 after a voyage of 181 days (her longest).

Fate
U-178 was scuttled on 25 August 1944 at Bordeaux, as she was not deemed seaworthy enough to escape the Allied advance. The U-boat was broken up in 1947.

Summary of raiding history

References

Bibliography

External links

German Type IX submarines
U-boats commissioned in 1942
Indian Ocean U-Boats
1941 ships
World War II submarines of Germany
Ships built in Bremen (state)
Maritime incidents in August 1944